Mountain banksia may refer to:
Banksia canei
Banksia oreophila

Banksia taxa by common name